The Watchmaker is a Windows adventure video game developed by Trecision and published by Got Game Entertainment in Europe in 2001 and in North America on June 1, 2002.

Gameplay

Plot

Development
The game was announced in August 2000. According to Trecision, The Watchmaker was in production for over 3 years. It was originally developed under the working title WM. The game struggled to find a North American distributor, but was ultimately signed by Got Game Entertainment in early 2002, which released it that June.

Reception

The Watchmaker received "mixed or average reviews" from critics, according to Metacritic.

Charles Herold of The New York Times presented The Watchmaker with a negative review. He wrote, "The graphics are poor, the interface is unwieldy, the puzzles are tedious and the characters' voices are so inferior that one suspects they were recorded by the company's programmers and secretaries." John Brandon of Computer Games Magazine concurred, writing that "The Watchmaker is stuck in the dark ages of computer gaming".

The Watchmaker was a nominee for The Electric Playgrounds 2002 "Best Adventure Game for PC" award, but lost to Syberia and Silent Hill 2 (tie).

References

External links
Official site (archived)

2001 video games
Adventure games
Got Game Entertainment games
Point-and-click adventure games
Trecision games
Video games developed in Italy
Windows games
Windows-only games